The Suhaniah fruit bat (Thoopterus suhaniahae) is a species of megabat in the family Pteropodidae. It is native to Indonesia and was discovered in 2012.

Distribution 
This species is common in the central and southern part of the island of Sulawesi and the surrounding islands. It lives in forests between 60 and 1,930 meters above sea level.

References 

Mammals described in 2012
Megabats